Narasapur–Nidadavolu Express is  an Express train belonging to South Coast Railway zone of Indian Railways that runs between  and  of Andhra Pradesh state in India.

Background
It was running as Narasapur–Visakhapatnam Link Express but due to high passenger demand, it was delinked from Simhadri Express and ran as Narasapur–Nidadavolu DEMU, numbered 77275 / 77276, on 20 March 2018. But due to some passenger security reasons, it was converted into an Express train on 15 August 2018.

Service
The frequency of this train is daily, it covers the distance of 76 km with an average speed of 37 km/hr.

Routes
This train passes through  on both sides.

Traction
As this route is currently going to be electrified, a WDP-4 loco pulls the train to its destination on both sides.

External links
 17241 Narasapur – Nidadavolu Express
 17242 Nidadavolu – Narasapur Express

References

Express trains in India
Rail transport in Andhra Pradesh